Hans Riddervold (7 November 1795 – 20 July 1876) was a Norwegian priest and politician.

Personal life
He was born at Teien in Åsgårdstrand as a son of shipmaster Adolf Kvernheim Riddervold (1760–1817) and Bredine Bolette Nielsen (1773–1811). He was the father of Julius Riddervold, who in turn was a grandfather of Hans Julius Riddervold. Hans Riddervold's daughter Bodil Mathea married Cato Guldberg and the daughter Mette Marie Riddervold married Peter Andreas Jensen.

Hans Riddervold married Anna Maria Bull (1803–1870) in June 1822. She was a younger sister of Cato Guldberg's mother Hanna Sophie Theresia Bull, making Cato and Bodil Mathea first cousins.

Career
He received his Cand.theol. degree in 1819.  He was the bishop of Nidaros from 1843 until 1849.  In 1827, he was elected to the Parliament of Norway and while in office, he was elected as the president of the Storting.

He was the minister of church affairs and education for several periods between 1848 and 1872, as well as minister of auditing in 1852 and minister of finance in 1853, and member of the Council of State Division in Stockholm from 1849 to 1850 and 1854–1855.

Riddervold was awarded the Grand Cross of the Order of St. Olav in 1859 and the Gold Medal for Outstanding Civic Service in 1869.

References

 

 

1795 births
1876 deaths
People from Vestfold
Presidents of the Storting
Government ministers of Norway
19th-century Norwegian politicians
Ministers of Finance of Norway
Bishops of Nidaros
Ministers of Education of Norway